Owingsville is a home rule-class city in Bath County, Kentucky, in the United States. The population was 1,530 during the year 2010 U.S. Census. It is the county seat and is located roughly at the county's center, at the junction of US 60 and Kentucky 36. It is part of the Mount Sterling micropolitan area.

History
In 1795, Colonel Thomas Dye Owings was sent from Maryland to Kentucky by his father to operate some of the first iron furnaces in the region. Within 15 years, Owings had amassed a good deal of wealth and land. Along with Colonel Richard H. Menefee, Owings founded the community that took his name, Owingsville.

Owings and Menefee each owned significant parcels of land in what would become Owingsville. To select whose name the community would take, the two men wagered that the man who built the finer home the quickest would be the namesake of the town. For the sum of $60,000, Owings won the contest. Owingsville was then founded in 1811.

Geography
Owingsville is located at  (38.142694, -83.766135).

Demographics

In the census of 2000, there were 1,488 people, 659 households, and 419 families in the city. The racial makeup of the city was 95.23% White, 3.97% African American, 0.13% Native American, and 0.67% from two or more races. 0.67% of the population were Hispanic or Latino of any race.

There were 659 households, out of which 28.5% had children under the age of 18 living with them, 41.7% were married couples living together, 17.9% had a female householder with no husband present, and 36.4% were non-families. 34.4% of all households were made up of individuals, and 22.5% had someone living alone who was 65 years of age or older. The average household size was 2.17 and the average family size was 2.73.

In the city, the population was spread out, with 21.2% under the age of 18, 9.3% from 18 to 24, 22.7% from 25 to 44, 21.0% from 45 to 64, and 25.7% who were 65 years of age or older. The median age was 43 years. For every 100 females, there were 78.6 males. For every 100 females age 18 and over, there were 71.2 males.

The median income for a household in the city was $21,897, and the median income for a family was $34,167. Males had a median income of $30,893 versus $20,208 for females. The per capita income for the city was $18,156. 26.6% of the population and 23.3% of families were below the poverty line. Out of the total population, 41.1% of those under the age of 18 and 18.7% of those 65 and older were living below the poverty line.

Education
Owingsville has a public library, the Bath County Memorial Library.

Arts and culture
Every year the county celebrates with the May Day Pageant, where high school seniors can compete for the title of "Miss Bath County". The pageant tradition started in 1954 and is a beloved tradition of the community. The week consists of various activities including a cake auction and a parade.

Every year the town has their annual "March Against Drugs" march, in which student from the three schools located in town march from the school, uptown, and back to the school for an assembly.

Notable natives
George Nicholas Bascom, U.S. Army officer whose arrest of Chief Cochise started the Apache Wars
John Bell Hood, Confederate general
Andrew Trumbo (1797–1871), United States Representative from Kentucky

References

External links
The Bath County News-Outlook

Cities in Bath County, Kentucky
Cities in Kentucky
County seats in Kentucky
Mount Sterling, Kentucky micropolitan area
John Bell Hood